The Rev. Samuel Woodward House is a historic house located at 19 Concord Road in Weston, Massachusetts. Built in 1753, it is a well-preserved example of mid-18th century Georgian architecture. It has also been home to a succession of people significant to the history of the town. It was listed on the National Register of Historic Places in 1976, and was included in Weston's Boston Post Road Historic District in 1983.

Description and history
The Woodward House stands just west of the main cluster of buildings making up Weston village's commercial heart. It is located on the north side of Concord Road, just north of its junction with Boston Post Road, and roughly opposite the end of Fiske Lane. It is a typical Georgian colonial house,  stories in height, with a gabled roof, central chimney, and clapboarded exterior. It has five bays on the front facade, with a central entry. The entry has been projected (a likely later addition) to provide a vestibule area under a gabled roof. The entry is framed by pilasters and a modest entablature; the gable above is pedimented.

The house was built in 1753 by Reverend Samuel Woodward, the town's second minister, on land he purchased in 1752. The house is believed to incorporate elements of an older house, probably built by the previous landowner, William Smith. In addition to Rev. Woodward, the house has also been occupied by his successor, Rev. Samuel Kendal. Kendal sold the house to Artemas Ward, Jr., a prominent local lawyer and politician who lived in the house next door. Ward sold this house in 1797 to Dr. Amos Bancroft, who was the town physician for many years, and was active in local town government. It was owned for over 100 years by the Fiske family.

See also
National Register of Historic Places listings in Weston, Massachusetts

References

Houses on the National Register of Historic Places in Middlesex County, Massachusetts
Houses in Weston, Massachusetts
Historic district contributing properties in Massachusetts
Houses completed in 1753
Georgian architecture in Massachusetts